The Warri Crisis was a series of conflicts in Delta State, Nigeria between 1997 and 2003 between the Itsekiri, the Ijaw, and the Urhobo ethnic groups. Over 200,000 people were displaced by the Warri conflict between 1999 and 2006. Over 700,000 people were displaced during this period by violence in Delta State overall.

The conflict broke out following a government decision that changed the location of the Warri South West Local Government Council (LGA) to the Itsekeri community of Ogidigben from the Ijaw town of Ogbe Ijoh. The Council headquarters was eventually returned to Ogbe Ijoh, which restored a fragile peace in 2005.  

The Warri Crisis is part of a broader conflict over oil in the Niger Delta. Human Rights Watch determined that "although the violence has both ethnic and political dimensions, it is essentially a fight over the oil money." Ongoing armed conflict in the Niger Delta region, and the appearance of the Movement for the Emancipation of the Niger Delta (MEND) in 2005 are continued expressions of these tensions.

Scholars have warned that the conflict is complex and not amenable to "quick fixes".

Background
Ethnic tensions around control of the Warri region pre-date European presence, but colonisation exacerbated these tensions by introducing power imbalances. This power imbalance was drastically accelerated during the british colonial process of "reorganization" that took place between 1928-38 after an "anti-government movment" which british colonial officials termed the 1927 Boycott. The intention of the reorganization process was to create a better indirect rule system that was based on what the british colonial officers at the time referred to as "native authority", however, the result of the reogranization in the Warri Province was a zero-sum ethic consolidation, as the more ethinically discrete a governing unit was the more access it had to state resources from tax revenues. 

The Itsekiri were first in the area to make contact with European traders in the 16th century, and they established dominance in the region by monopolising the European trade in slaves and later palm oil. The Itsekiri also established control of land through early legal documents during the British Empire. 

In 1952, Obafemi Awolowo's government of Western Nigeria changed the title of the Itsekiri traditional ruler from Olu of Itsekiri to Olu of Warri (a title that had been defunct for 88 years and was reinstated by the british in 1936  during the reorganization process). This further increased tension, as the other tribes saw this as an attempt to impose an Itsekiri ruler over them since the title Olu of Warri implied authority over the Warri Province and not just the Warri district. (Over 80% of the present Delta State was referred to as Warri Province at that time.). 

As a compromise, in 1952, the government of Western Nigeria changed the name of the province from the Warri Province to the Delta Province (precusor to the current delta state). This reduced the protest against the change of the title to the Olu of Warri in the province, however non-Itsekiri communities residing in the Warri Division still protested the decision. (as of 1952 before the name change, there was the Warri Province, the Warri Division, the Warri Districit and the City of Warri which was the provincial capital. The Warri division contained numerious of Urhobo and Ijaw communities that were not under Itsekiri control or influence).

Oil-related conflict 
The discovery of large oil reserves in the Niger Delta in the early 1960s further destabilised the region, as control of land and local government became connected to benefits from oil contracts, jobs, and development by the oil companies. 

The Warri crisis is a complex case where ethnic tensions are exacerbated by conflict between local communities and oil companies (notably Chevron Nigeria and Shell Petroleum Development Company). There is also conflict between the communities and the state. Access to oil revenue is a major factor. Oil bunkering is the theft of crude oil by various parties including militant groups, and has been increasingly important in the area with annual losses between 50 and 300 million barrels between 2001 and 2003. Oil money also feeds the arms trade and the further militarisation of all aspects of civic and corporate behavior.  

There are extensive environmental issues in the Niger Delta resulting from oil activities. Millions of barrels of oil were spilled in a 50-year period following the discovery of oil – an amount equal to an Exxon Valdez oil spill every year. People in the region also receive few benefits from the enormous wealth extracted from the region: the area is plagued by administrative neglect, unemployment, crumbling infrastructure, poverty, and endless conflict. The pollution has made people more reliant on income from oil companies, as traditional modes such as farming and fishing are no longer possible in the polluted environment. Many services traditionally provided by governments, such as local security, are delegated to the oil companies with little accountability.

Violence (1997–2003) 
In 1997, the federal government under General Sani Abacha created several Local Government Areas (LGAs), including Warri South-West. The headquarters of this LGA was originally located in the Ijaw community of Ogbe Ijoh, but was relocated to the Itsekeri community of Ogidigben. Riots ensued, hundreds died, and six Shell Nigeria (SPDC) installations were taken over, leading to a drop in oil production. Thousands were injured in these initial clashes.  

Fighting renewed in 1999 and continued intermittently. Hundreds of people were killed over a period of several months in early 2003 when conflict broke out between Itsekiris and Urhobos during primary elections for state and federal governments. The dispute arose from disagreements about the number of wards making up the district and their boundaries. The Nigerian Red Cross reported more than 6000 internally displaced people. At this time, the Ijaw National Congress (INC) said the Warri Crisis was constant and unending. They urged state and federal governments to act on recommendations and reports the agencies had been furnished from reputable commissions.

The 2003 unrest involved the biggest military operation against civilians in Nigeria at the time. Some military personnel were killed, and there were reports of indiscriminate reprisals against civilians.

The headquarters were relocated back to Ogbe Ijoh by the Delta State House of Assembly, a decision that brought relative peace back to the city by 2005.

Impact and legacy 
Over 200,000 people were displaced by the Warri conflict between 1999 and 2006; over 700,000 people were displaced by violence in Delta State overall.

The 2003 conflicts interrupted oil production. Chevron Texaco lost about 140,000 barrels of crude oil per day, and Shell Petroleum lost about 60,000 barrels per day. The Escravos pipeline was blown up by militant youths.

Ongoing armed conflict in the Niger Delta region, and the appearance of the Movement for the Emancipation of the Niger Delta (MEND) in 2005 are continued expressions of these tensions.

See also 
 Environmental justice
 Environmental racism
 Oil theft in Nigeria

References

External Links 
 The Warri Crisis: Fueling Violence, 2003 report by Human Rights Watch
 THE PRICE OF OIL Corporate Responsibility and Human Rights Violations in Nigeria’s Oil Producing Communities. 1999 report by Human Rights Watch
 NIGERIA: WARRI CRISIS COMING TO A HEAD, wikileaks.org. Date:2003 April 17, 22:26
 Letters to State Department on Warri Crisis; Urhobo Historical Society

Violence in Nigeria
Delta State
Environmental justice